Muhammad Amin Shah Sani was a Sufi scholar from Pakistan belonging to the Nahbandi order. He is known as a Hanafi scholar  and saint. He received his early Qur'anic education at the Khankah Allo Mahar. The first of his ancestors in Allo Mahar was Muhammad Jewan Shah Naqvi, well known by the pen-name of Shair Sawar Sarkar. He traces his roots to the first Arab Shaikhs descending from Muhammad through the lineage of Husayn.

Family
His father Muhammad Channan Shah Nuri was a scholar, saint, and preacher in South Asia. He preached in South Asia and brought non-Muslims into the fold of Islam. His son Muhammad Hussain Shah succeeded him.

Sufi order
He belonged to the Naqshbandi Sufi order and was one of the disciples of Bahaudin Naqshband.

Shrine

His mausoleum is in Allo Mahar. It is a square which is surmounted by a hemispherical dome. Many pilgrims visit it on his death anniversary.

Descendants 

Muhammad Hussain Shah
Noor Hussain Shah
Fazal Hussain Shah
Manzoor Hussain Shah
and two daughters.

See also 
Allo Mahar
Muhammad Jewan Shah Naqvi
Muhammad Channan Shah Nuri
Syed Faiz-ul Hassan Shah
Khalid Hasan Shah
Sahabzada Syed Murtaza Amin

Further reading 
The Preaching of Islam by Sir Thomas Walker Arnold and Langue la literature Hindoustanies de 1850 à 1869 by M.J.H. Garcin de Tassy.
Mashaiekh e Allo Mahar Shrief written by Allmaa Pir saeed Ahmad Mujadadi and published by Idara e Tanzeem ul Islam Gujjranwala.
"Allo Mahar Sharif". Kawajgan e Naqshband (book name). 
"Kwaja Nur muhammad chhrahi's caliph". Arbab e Waliyat (book name). 
"caliph's of chura sharif". Auliya e pothohar (book name). 
Shaik gulam nabi. Amir e Karwan Syed Faiz ul Hasan shah (book name). 
"Syed Faiz ul Hassan shah". Tahreek e Ihrar (book name). 
Dr. Rizwan Sarwar. Mashaikh e Maharvia (under publish). 
Pir Saeed Ahmad Mujadadi. Maharvia number (book name).

References

Islamic religious leaders
1913 deaths
1829 births
Sialkot District